Sunderland City Council elections are generally held three years out of every four, with a third of the council being elected each time. Sunderland City Council is the local authority for the metropolitan borough of the City of Sunderland in Tyne and Wear, England. Since the last boundary changes in 2004, 75 councillors have been elected from 25 wards.

Political control
From 1889 to 1974 Sunderland was a county borough, independent of any county council. Under the Local Government Act 1972 it had its territory enlarged and became a metropolitan borough, with Tyne and Wear County Council providing county-level services. The first election to the reconstituted borough council was held in 1973, initially operating as a shadow authority before coming into its revised powers on 1 April 1974. Tyne and Wear County Council was abolished in 1986 and Sunderland became a unitary authority. Sunderland was awarded city status in 1992. Political control of the council since 1973 has been held by the following parties:

Leadership
The leaders of the council since 2002 have been:

Council composition 
Whilst under Labour control solidly since 1973, the political composition of Sunderland City Council has fluctuated over the years as the Conservatives, SDP-Liberal Alliance, and Independents gained seats from the Labour Party. Until 2019, only Labour, Conservatives, Liberal Democrats and Independents (including Independent Labour) had ever won seats on Sunderland City Council. When UKIP and Green Party councillors were elected in 2019, Sunderland became one of the few British councils with all five parties represented. The table below gives an impression of the Council's composition based on local election results.

Council elections
Sunderland's Council area comprises 25 wards, each electing three councillors. Elections are held in thirds, in three years out of every four. Between 1974 and 1986, elections were held in every fourth year to Tyne and Wear County Council, until the County Council was abolished. In 1982 and 2004, all seats on Sunderland Council were up for election following boundary changes.

Elections under 1973-1980 boundaries 
 Sunderland Metropolitan Borough Council election, 1973 (whole council elected)
 Sunderland Metropolitan Borough Council election, 1975
 Sunderland Metropolitan Borough Council election, 1976
 Sunderland Metropolitan Borough Council election, 1978
 Sunderland Metropolitan Borough Council election, 1979
 Sunderland Metropolitan Borough Council election, 1980

Elections under 1982-2003 boundaries 
Sunderland Metropolitan Borough Council election, 1982 (whole council elected after boundary changes)
Sunderland Metropolitan Borough Council election, 1983
Sunderland Metropolitan Borough Council election, 1984
Sunderland Metropolitan Borough Council election, 1986
Sunderland Metropolitan Borough Council election, 1987
Sunderland Metropolitan Borough Council election, 1988
Sunderland Metropolitan Borough Council election, 1990
Sunderland Metropolitan Borough Council election, 1991
1992 Sunderland City Council election
1994 Sunderland City Council election
1995 Sunderland City Council election
1996 Sunderland City Council election
1998 Sunderland City Council election
1999 Sunderland City Council election
2000 Sunderland City Council election
2002 Sunderland City Council election
2003 Sunderland City Council election

Elections under 2004 boundaries 
2004 Sunderland City Council election (whole council elected after boundary changes)
2006 Sunderland City Council election
2007 Sunderland City Council election
2008 Sunderland City Council election
2010 Sunderland City Council election
2011 Sunderland City Council election
2012 Sunderland City Council election
2014 Sunderland City Council election
2015 Sunderland City Council election
2016 Sunderland City Council election
2018 Sunderland City Council election
2019 Sunderland City Council election
2021 Sunderland City Council election
2022 Sunderland City Council election

Election results maps

By-election results

1997-2004

2004-present

At the time of resignation, incumbent Keith Jenkins was an independent.

References

By-election results

External links
Sunderland City Council

 
Council elections in Tyne and Wear
Politics of the City of Sunderland
Metropolitan borough council elections in England